Corvette Summer is a 1978 American adventure comedy film directed by Matthew Robbins. It was Mark Hamill's first screen appearance after the unexpected success of Star Wars the previous year. Hamill stars as a California teenager who heads to Las Vegas to track down his beloved customized Corvette Stingray. Co-star Annie Potts, playing the quirky young woman he meets along the way, was nominated for a Golden Globe Award in her first film role.

Corvette Summer was a box office success, making about $36 million at the worldwide box office, on a relatively small budget (for that era) of $1.7 million. The film however, received a divided response from critics.

Plot

Kenny Dantley is a car-loving high school senior from Newhall, California. For a project in his shop class, Kenny rescues a 1973 Chevrolet Corvette Stingray from inside an operating car crusher in a scrapyard and helps rebuild it as a customized right-hand-drive with flashy bodywork. Shortly after the new set of wheels is unveiled, the car is stolen from the streets of Van Nuys. After hearing that the car is in Las Vegas, Kenny immediately sets out to take back the stolen car. On the way, he meets the seemingly confident drifter Vanessa, who is a self-described "prostitute trainee."

Kenny finds work in a Vegas car wash, and spots his car on more than one occasion; the police eventually get involved but cannot help locate the vehicle once it's discovered it bears a forged tag. He tracks it down it to a local garage, where he has an incident with the garage owner, Wayne Lowry, before being bailed out by Vanessa. Kenny’s high school teacher, Ed McGrath, comes to Las Vegas, and Kenny is upset to learn that the teacher he once admired had arranged for the theft of the Corvette to help supplement his low earnings as a teacher. McGrath arranges for Kenny to go to work for Lowry. For his sake and that of his family, McGrath begs Kenny not to take the matter to the police. McGrath also ominously notes that if Kenny doesn't agree, one of Lowry's men will "handle it his way." Kenny agrees, but secretly plans to take the Corvette back.

Eventually, Kenny takes the car back, saves the mermaid-costumed Vanessa from adult-film makers in a hotel, wins a wild car chase, and returns home with Vanessa riding shotgun in the Corvette. He keeps McGrath's secret, but rebuffs his attempts to repair their friendship. He gives the car back to the school, but walks away with Vanessa and his newly-earned high school diploma.

Cast

Production
Working titles for the film were Dantley & Vanessa: A Fiberglass Romance, Stingray and The Hot One. Scenes of Kenny's high school were filmed at Burbank High School (Burbank, California) in the San Fernando Valley, and Verdugo Hills High School outside of Los Angeles.

The novelization of Corvette Summer was written by Wayland Drew. The book was published by the New American Library of Canada in 1978.

The film's theme song, "Give Me the Night", was sung by Dusty Springfield.

The Corvette
There were two Corvettes made for the film (both 1973 model years): a “main” car and a "backup" model, both built for MGM by Korky's Kustom Studios. The “main” car was often displayed during the film's publicity tour, and both cars were later sold by MGM to private parties. The “main” car was sold to an Australian collector and altered to look different from how it appears in the film. An original mold of the car from the film was displayed at the Corvette Americana Hall of Fame in Cooperstown, New York, and is now part of the collection of the National Corvette Museum. The "backup" car remained in the U.S., was owned for a while by Mike Yager of Mid America Motorworks in Effingham, Illinois, and was on display there between periodic car shows. Yager sold the car to a private collector in late 2009. That car is now believed to be in New Zealand.

Release
The film was released in 450 theaters in the Atlanta, Charlotte and New Orleans areas on June 2, 1978.

Critical response
Janet Maslin of The New York Times wrote that the central portion of the film "has a visual zaniness that meshes effectively with the script. But for the most part, the movie takes a slender, boyish conceit — of the sort that is suddenly so popular among Hollywood's current batch of boy wonders — and invests it with silliness rather than whimsy." Gene Siskel gave the film two stars out of four and wrote that it "would like to develop the same wistful quality as 'American Graffiti.' It doesn't." Arthur D. Murphy of Variety called the film "a most delightful comedy," adding, "Robbins' direction is assured and the performances are all super." Linda Gross of the Los Angeles Times called the film "a well-made love story about a boy, a girl and a souped-up sports car with outstanding performances by Mark Hamill and Annie Potts as two innocents afoot in a terrible world." Gary Arnold of The Washington Post wrote, "It comes as a keen disappointment when the movie's initially promising plot begins coughing, sputtering and misfiring incessantly." David Ansen of Newsweek wrote, "This is Robins's first chance to show his stuff as a director, and from the evidence he has a good future behind the camera. His story may be predictable, his aim modest. But he demonstrates a fluid eye, and his flair for pacing and inventive use of locations make 'Corvette Summer' pleasant to watch whether or not you know a Stingray from a Monte Carlo." Critic Frank Rich of Time magazine thought the movie was an appropriate summer "popcorn flick." He wrote "As long as one doesn't demand too much of it, Corvette Summer delivers a very pleasant two hours of escape." TV Guide agreed, calling the film "all in all a very funny movie with enough solid, believable story to take it beyond the realm of teenage summer fare."

Overall, the review aggregator Rotten Tomatoes reported that 56% of critics gave the film a positive review, based on nine reviews.

Box office
Corvette Summer grossed $1,329,904 in its opening weekend going on to gross $15,514,367 in the United States and Canada, and about $36 million worldwide.

Awards and nominations
In 1979, Annie Potts was nominated for a Golden Globe Award for "Best Motion Picture Acting Debut—Female" for her work in the film.

Legacy
In Episode 513 (The Brain That Wouldn't Die) of Mystery Science Theater 3000, Mike Nelson exclaims, "Luke, join me or you'll star in Corvette Summer." This is an allusion to Mark Hamill's role in the Star Wars films. The Beck song "Corvette Bummer" is an allusion to the film.

In the 2017 Justice League Action short episode "Missing the Mark", Trickster (voiced by Hamill) mentions Corvette Summer as his favorite film to an animated Mark Hamill, describing the premise to sound like he is talking about Star Wars before mentioning it by title.

See also
 List of films set in Las Vegas

References

External links
 
 
 
 
 
 Korkys Kustom Studios

1978 films
1978 comedy films
1978 directorial debut films
1970s adventure comedy films
1970s comedy road movies
1970s teen comedy films
American adventure comedy films
American comedy road movies
American teen comedy films
1970s English-language films
Films about automobiles
Films directed by Matthew Robbins
Films scored by Craig Safan
Films set in the Las Vegas Valley
Films set in Los Angeles
Films shot in the Las Vegas Valley
Films shot in Los Angeles
Films with screenplays by Matthew Robbins
Metro-Goldwyn-Mayer films
Teen adventure films
1970s American films